The 1995 Chattanooga Moccasins football team represented the University of Tennessee at Chattanooga as a member of the Southern Conference (SoCon) in the 1995 NCAA Division I-AA football season. The Moccasins were led by second-year head coach Buddy Green and played their home games at Chamberlain Field. They finished the season 4–7 overall and 2–6 in SoCon play to tie for seventh place.

Schedule

References

Chattanooga
Chattanooga Mocs football seasons
Chattanooga Moccasins football